Annulobalcis procera is a species of sea snail, a marine gastropod mollusc in the family Eulimidae.

Description
The maximum recorded shell length is 14.6 mm.

Habitat
Minimum recorded depth is 61 m. Maximum recorded depth is 640 m.

References

External links

Eulimidae
Gastropods described in 2002